St Andrew's Church, Buckland Monachorum is a Grade I listed parish church in the Church of England Diocese of Exeter in Buckland Monachorum, Devon.

History

The church is medieval, but much was rebuilt in the late 15th century.

A restoration was undertaken in 1868-69 under the supervision of Mr. H. Elliott, architect of Plymouth. The west end gallery was removed. The roof was restored. The old pews were replaced with new pews of oak. The medieval bench ends were preserved where possible and new ones carved in a similar style. The walls were plastered, and the windows were re-glazed with plain cathedral glass. A stained glass window by Heaton and Butler was installed at the east end with a representation of the Good Shepherd. The church reopened for worship on Thursday 8 July 1869.

The church is noted for the monuments in the Drake aisle. Those to George Augustus Eliott, 1st Baron Heathfield of 1795 and Sir Francis Henry Drake, 5th Baronet of 1794 are by John Bacon Senior. The memorial to Francis Augustus Eliott, 2nd Baron Heathfield is by John Bacon Junior and the memorial to Dame Eleanor Elliott Drake (d. 1841) is by Richard Westmacott.

Rectors

Organ

The organ was installed by H.P. Dicker of Exeter in 1849. It was playable either by a person on the keyboard, or by a barrel. It was the gift of Sir Thomas Fuller-Eliott-Drake, Bart.

It was expanded in 1920 by Hele & Co of Plymouth when a second manual was added. Subsequent rebuildings and enlargements have resulted in a 2 manual organ with 24 speaking stops. A specification of the organ can be found in the National Pipe Organ Register.

Bells
The tower contains a peal of 8 bells. Five of the bells date from 1723 by Christopher and John Pennington, and 3 date from 1947 by Gillett & Johnston.

References

Buckland Monachorum
Buckland Monachorum